Walton (also known as Walton Junction) is an unincorporated community in the northwestern Lower Peninsula of Michigan. It is located mainly in Fife Lake Township, Grand Traverse County, Michigan, although it is partially located in Liberty Township, Wexford County, Michigan. US 131 and M-113 run through the town.

Railroads 
Walton gained significance in its early days as a junction point on the Grand Rapids and Indiana Railroad and Manistee and North-Eastern Railroad, later to become the Chesapeake and Ohio Railway. These railways were obliterated in later years. The Traverse City Railroad was constructed in 1872, and allowed for easy travel from southern Michigan to the Traverse City area. Today, these railroads are still in service, and a passenger railroad has become of greater interest. The railroad yard of Walton Junction is mentioned in Ernest Hemingway's short story, “The Battler.”

Geography 
Walton is a community situated right in the Traverse City State Forest. It is on the line between Grand Traverse County and Wexford County. The town also sits on Walton Marsh.

Nearby communities 
The town itself is about halfway between Traverse City and Cadillac.

Major highways

See also 
 List of cities, villages, and townships in Michigan
 List of ghost towns in Michigan

References 

Unincorporated communities in Grand Traverse County, Michigan
Unincorporated communities in Wexford County, Michigan
Unincorporated communities in Michigan